Baylander (IX-514), ex-YFU-79, was a United States Navy Helicopter Landing Trainer (HLT), billed as the world's smallest aircraft carrier. It served as a practice landing site for helicopter pilots in the United States Navy, Army, Air Force, Marine Corps, Coast Guard, and National Guard.

History
The ship entered operations with the United States Navy in 1968 as harbor utility craft YFU-79 and served in the Vietnam War; from mid-1970 it served with the United States Army. At the end of the war YFU-79 was withdrawn to Guam. In the mid-1980s it was returned to the Navy and converted to a Helicopter Landing Trainer by Bender Shipbuilding in Mobile, Alabama, entering service on 31 March 1986 at Naval Air Station Pensacola, Florida. By August 2006, she had achieved 100,000 accident-free helicopter landings, and by the time of her retirement had surpassed 120,000 landings. After being taken out of service and struck from the Naval Register in 2011, Baylander was sold into private hands instead of being scrapped. In 2014, it was moved to the Brooklyn Bridge Park Marina in New York City and opened as a museum ship. By mid-2016, the vessel had been relocated to the West Harlem Piers on the Hudson River. , the Baylander serves as a restaurant and bar.

Specifications
Baylander was built as Yard No. 238 by Pacific Coast Engineering (PACECO) of Alameda, California.

References

External links

 
 Homepage of The Baylander Steel Beach

1968 ships
Ships built in California
Helicopter carriers
Unclassified miscellaneous vessels of the United States Navy
Vietnam War auxiliary ships of the United States
Aircraft carriers of the United States Navy
Training ships of the United States Navy